

Football

National teams 

Algeria national football team
EPTV
Brasil Global Tour
beIN Sports
 Iran national football team
 IRIB
 beIN Sports (FIFA World Cup qualification matches only, from third round onwards)
 Iraq national football team
 Alrabiaa (include FIFA World Cup qualification)
 Japan national football team
 Sharjah Sports (exclude FIFA World Cup qualification matches)
 Jordan national football team
 Jordan Sports (exclude FIFA World Cup qualification matches, from third round onwards)
 Kuwait national football team
 Kuwait Sports (exclude FIFA World Cup qualification matches, from third round onwards)
Morocco national football team
Arryadia
Egypt national football team
 ON Time Sports
Oman national football team (exclude FIFA World Cup qualification matches, from third round onwards)
Oman Sports
Abu Dhabi Sports
 Qatar national football team
 Al Kass
 beIN Sports
 Saudi Arabia national football team
 SSC Sports
 Shahid
Tunisia national football team
ERTT
 United Arab Emirates national football team (exclude FIFA World Cup qualification matches, from third round onwards)
 AD Sports
 Dubai Sports
 Sharjah Sports

UEFA
beIN Sports

Leagues 
UEFA: beIN Sports, and IRIB (Iran only, men's UCL and UEL only)
UEFA Champions League
UEFA Europa League
UEFA Europa Conference League
UEFA Youth League
UEFA Women's Champions League

CONCACAF Champions League
YouTube

CAF Champions League
beIN Sports

 AFC Champions League
Shahid (KSA Only)
AD Sports , Dubai sports (UAE only)
Alrabiaa (Iraq only)
beIN Sports (All Arab countries except KSA, UAE and Iraq)
Premier League
beIN Sports
Championship 
beIN Sports
La Liga 
beIN Sports
Serie A
AD Sports
StarzPlay
Bundesliga
beIN Sports
2. Bundesliga
beIN Sports
Ligue 1 
beIN Sports
Ligue 2
beIN Sports
Turkish super lig
TOD [4 matches per gameweek]
beIN Sports [1 match per gameweek]
Primeira Liga
 SSC Sports
Shahid
Eredivisie
StarzPlay [english commentary only]
Major League Soccer
AD Sports
A-League Men
Abu Dhabi Sports
Campeonato Brasileiro Série A
 SSC Sports
Shahid 
J1 League
Dubai Sports
Shahid
UAE Pro-League
AD Sports
Dubai Sports
Sharjah Sports
Qatar Stars League
beIN Sports
Al-Kass Sports
Saudi Professional League
 SSC Sports
Shahid 
Kuwait Premier League
Kuwait Sports
Al-Kass Sports
Oman Professional League
Oman Sports
Bahraini Premier League
 Bahrain Sports
Iraq Premier League
Iraqia sports
Egyptian Premier League
ON Time Sports
Botola Pro
Arryadia
Algerian Ligue Professionelle 1
EPTV
Tunisian Ligue Professionnelle 1
ERTT
Al-Kass Sports
Jordan Premier League
Jordan Sports
Lebanese Premier League
MTV

Cups 
FIFA
FIFA World Cup
Finals: 
beIN Sports
IRIB (Iran only)
Qualifiers: 
beIN Sports (UEFA and CONMEBOL)
IRIB (Iran only)
 SSC Sports (Saudi only, AFC only)
Shahid (Saudi only, AFC only)
AD Sports (UAE only, AFC only)
Alrabiaa (Iraq only, and AFC only)
ASBU (until or only second round for AFC matches and selected CAF matches)
TBA (CONCACAF and OFC)
beIN Sports (Inter Confederation play-offs)
FIFA Club World Cup
 SSC Sports
Shahid
AD Sports

Other: beIN Sports
FIFA Women's World Cup
FIFA U-20 World Cup
FIFA U-17 World Cup
FIFA Arab Cup
FIFA U-20 Women's World Cup
FIFA U-17 Women's World Cup

UEFA: beIN Sports and IRIB (Iran only, Euro and Super Cup only)
UEFA European Championship (including qualifiers)
UEFA European Under-21 Championship
UEFA European Under-19 Championship
UEFA Women's Championship
UEFA Women's Under-19 Championship
UEFA European Under-17 Championship
UEFA Women's Under-17 Championship
UEFA Super Cup

CAF: beIN Sports
Africa Cup of Nations (including qualifiers)
African Nations Championship
Africa U-23 Cup of Nations
Africa U-20 Cup of Nations
Africa U-17 Cup of Nations
Women's Africa Cup of Nations
CAF Confederation Cup
CAF Super Cup

AFC: beIN Sports, SSC Sports (KSA only), Shahid (KSA only), IRIB (Iran only), and AD Sports (UAE only) and Alrabiaa Sports (Iraq only)
AFC Asian Cup
AFC U-23 Championship
AFC U-19 Championship
AFC U-16 Championship
AFC Women's Asian Cup 
AFC Futsal Championship
AFC Cup
AFC Futsal Club Championship

CONMEBOL: beIN Sports
Copa America
Copa Libertadores
Copa Sudamericana
Recopa Sudamericana

CONCACAF Gold Cup
beIN Sports
UEFA Nations League
ShahidFinalissimabeIN SportsFA CupbeIN SportsFA Community ShieldbeIN SportsEFL CupbeIN SportsCopa del ReySaudi Arabia
 SSC Sports
Shahid
IRIB (Iran only)Supercopa de España SSC Sports
ShahidCoppa ItaliaAD Sports
StarzPlay
IRIB (Iran only)Supercoppa ItalianaAD Sports
StarzPlay
IRIB (Iran only)DFB-PokalDubai SportsDFL-SupercupbeIN SportsCoupe de FrancebeIN SportsTrophée des Champions 
beIN SportsKNVB Cup 
Dubai Sports
ON Time SportsJohan Cruyff Shield 
Sharjah SportsKing CupShahidUAE President CupAD Sports
Dubai Sports
Sharjah SportsAlgerian CupEPTVEgypt CupON Time SportsEFA CupON Time Sports

Basketball
 National Basketball Association (NBA)beIN Sports
IRIB (Iran only)
 EuroLeagueStarzPlay
 EurocupStarzPlay
 Liga ACB Sharjah Sports
 ON Time Sports 
 FIBA Basketball World Cup beIN Sports
 EuroBasket FIBA AfroBasket  FIBA Asia Cup FIBA AmeriCup beIN SportsCopa del Rey de BaloncestoON Time Sports 
Sharjah Sports

 Basketball Africa League (BAL) 
ON Time Sports
 FIBA Intercontinental CupON Time Sports

Golf
 PGA Tour
 StarzPlay

Handball
 EHF Champions League
ON Time Sports 
Women's EHF Champions League
ON Time Sports
EHF European League
ON Time Sports
Women's EHF European League
ON Time Sports
 Handball-Bundesliga
 
 Liga ASOBAL
 
 LNH Division 1
 beIN Sports
 IHF World Men's Handball Championship
 ON Time Sports
 African Men's Handball Cup Winners' Cup
 ON Time Sports (only Final)
 European Men's Handball Championship
 beIN Sports
 African Men's Handball Championship
ON Time Sports
 Asian Men's Handball Championship
 beIN Sports
Al-Kass Sports
 SSC 
 KTV
 Asian Club League Handball Championship
 Al-Kass Sports
Gulf Clubs Handball Championship
 KTV
 AD Sports
Al-Kass Sports
 IHF Men's Super Globe
ON Time Sports
SSC

Tennis 
 Australian Open
 beIN Sports
 Wimbledon
 beIN Sports
 French Open
 beIN Sports
 US Open
 beIN Sports
 ATP World Tour Masters 1000
 beIN Sports
 ATP World Tour 500 series
 beIN Sports
 ATP World Tour 250 series
 beIN Sports
 Barclays ATP World Tour Finals
 beIN Sports
 WTA Tour Championships
 beIN Sports
 Laver cup
beIN Sports

Boxing 
Dream Boxing: DAZN: October 2022 to October 2025, all fights
Queensberry Promotions: StarzPlay
Golden Boy: DAZN
Matchroom Boxing: DAZN
Premier Boxing Champions: Fight Sports MAX
Top Rank: Fight Sports MAX

Kickboxing 
King of Kings: DAZN: October 2022 to October 2025, all fights

Mixed Martial Arts
Bushido MMA: DAZN: October 2022 to October 2025, all fights
Ultimate Fighting Championship (UFC): Abu Dhabi Sports and StarzPlay

Motorsport 
 Formula One
 MBC Action
 Shahid
 Formula Two
 Shahid
 Formula Three
 Shahid
Formula E
Shahid
Extreme E
Shahid
MotoGP
 beIN Sports
 NASCAR
 Abu Dhabi Sports
 Dakar Rally
 beIN Sports
 Shahid
 World Rally Championship
 Abu Dhabi Sports
 SBK Championship
beIN Sports
 Ferrari challenge
beIN Sports
 DTM Championship
beIN Sports
 Le mans 24hrs
beIN Sports
 formula W Series
beIN Sports

Cycling 
 Tour de France
 beIN Sports
 Giro d'Italia
 beIN Sports
 Vuelta a España
 beIN Sports
 Tirreno–Adriatico
 OSN Sports
 Paris-Nice
 beIN Sports

Cricket 

 Cricket in England
 England home internationals
 beIN Sports
 County Championship
 YouTube
 T20 Blast
 YouTube
 Cricket in Australia
 Australia home internationals
 beIN Sports
 Big Bash League (BBL)
 beIN Sports
 Sheffield Shield
 Cricket.com.au
 Cricket in India
 India home internationals
 Etisalat CricLife (UAE Only)
 Ranji Trophy
 Etisalat CricLife (UAE Only)
 Syed Mushtaq Ali Trophy
 Etisalat CricLife (UAE Only)
 Indian Premier League (IPL)
 beIN Sports

 Pakistan Cricket 
 ARY DIGITAL 
 Criclife

 Cricket in South Africa
 South Africa home internationals
 Etisalat CricLife (UAE Only)
 Cricket in Sri Lanka
 Sri Lanka home internationals
 Etisalat CricLife (UAE Only)
 Lanka Premier League
 Etisalat CricLife (UAE Only)

Other sports 
 National Football League (NFL)
 SSC
 Major League Baseball (MLB)
 beIN Sports
 National Hockey League (NHL)
Rugby World Cup
beIN Sports
CEV Champions League
 ON Time Sports 
FIVB Volleyball Men's Nations League
 Dubai Sports
PART
 KTV 
FIVB Volleyball Men's World Cup
Nile TV International
OnTime Sports
SNRT
El Watania 2
Dubai Sports
AD Sports
African Clubs Championship (volleyball)
AL Ahly TV (Ahly only ,semi final ,final only)
Squash World Open
World Super Series
British Open
Tournament of Champions
US Open
Hong Kong Open
Qatar Classic
Windy City Open
El Gouna International
PSA World Tour Finals 
Necker Mauritius Open
 ON Time Sports
Padel World Championship
 beIN Sports
NCAA Football
Abu Dhabi Sports
 NCAA Basketball
 Abu Dhabi Sports
Aramco Team Series
 SSC
World Cup of Pool
 SSC
PFL
 SSC
 SailGP
DAZN
 World Wrestling Entertainment (WWE)
MBC
 AEW World Championship
 StarzPlay
 ONE Championship
beIN Sports

Multi-sport events 
 Summer Olympics
 beIN Sports
 Winter Olympics
 beIN Sports
 Asian Games
SSC (KSA Only)
 African Games
 beIN Sports
  Pan Arab Games
 beIN Sports
SSC

 Middle East
  GCC Games
Al Kass
 KTV
  Mediterranean Games
EPTV
ONTime Sports

References